Alberto de las Casas (died 1544) was the Master of the Order of Preachers from 1542 to 1544.

Biography

At a chapter held in 1542, Casas was the candidate of Charles V, Holy Roman Emperor to be Master of the Order of Preachers; the Dominican Order elected Casas as their Master.

References

1544 deaths
Spanish Dominicans
Year of birth unknown
Masters of the Order of Preachers